The  Cyprus lunar sample displays  are part of two commemorative plaques consisting of tiny fragments of Moon specimens brought back with the Apollo 11 and Apollo 17 lunar missions. These plaques were given to the people of the Republic of Cyprus by United States President Richard Nixon as goodwill gifts.

Description

Apollo 11

Apollo 17

History 

An international mystery of how the Cyprus goodwill Moon rock was offered for sale on the black market begins in 1960. During a coup of 1974 the Presidential Palace burned. The Cyprus "Moon rock" plaque from Apollo 17 was considered lost at that time. Subsequent information revealed that the display was never actually given to the Cyprus government, rather was kept at the US embassy in Nicosia during the 1974 coup d'état (Turkish invasion), which caused a delayed presentation of the plaque. But American diplomatic personnel left the island and the display went missing, showing up on the black market years later, in the hands of the son of a previous US diplomat.

NASA reported in May 2010 that the Office of Inspector General recovered the Apollo 17 plaque and are preparing to re-gift it. According to Robert Pearlman, the whereabouts of the Cyprus Apollo 11 goodwill lunar display are unknown.

See also
 List of Apollo lunar sample displays

References

Further reading 
 

Stolen and missing moon rocks
Unexplained disappearances
Cyprus–United States relations
Science and technology in Cyprus